Sing If You Can is a British game show broadcast on ITV. It features celebrities attempting to sing in front of a live studio audience whilst various attempts are made to disrupt their performances. It is presented by Keith Lemon and Stacey Solomon, though originally Vernon Kay was scheduled to host, but he felt that it would be better hosted by a comedian. The show was sponsored by Argos, supporting the charity Teenage Cancer Trust.

Format
Six celebrities are divided into two teams, each with a captain. After the celebrity has performed, a three-person judging panel views their thoughts. After all six celebrities have performed, the audience vote to decide which team wins. The losing team captain is dropped into a tank of water, and the winning team then perform a final song on a spinning stage. The amount of money to be donated to charity increases as the stage spins, and the longer the celebrities stay on the stage, the more money they win. The show raised money for the Teenage Cancer Trust.

Episodes

Episode 1
Judging panel
Coleen Nolan
Shaun Ryder
Dave Gorman

Episode 2
Judging panel
Caroline Flack
John Thomson
Rob Rouse

Episode 3
Judging panel
Jarred Christmas
Jamelia
Richard Bacon

Episode 4
Judging panel
Trevor Nelson
Rachel Stevens
Louis Walsh

(*Sinitta could not participate as she had broken her ankle)

Episode 5
Judging panel
Patsy Palmer
Rob Deering
Ronni Ancona

Episode 6 – The Finale
Judging panel
Samantha Womack
Rob Rouse
Sara Cox

Reception
Reviews have been mainly negative. The Guardian TV critic Grace Dent was scathing about the show, calling it "the worst TV programme ever made". Daily Mirror columnist Kevin O'Sullivan called it "gormless garbage" and "mind-numbingly banal".

International versions
Most international versions of Twist and Shout, Sing If You Can, and Killer Karaoke.

Notes

 In India, the Tamil show Y this Kolaveri is loosely based on Killer Karaoke/Sing If You Can, as it deals with participants having to sing while avoiding challenging situations. Unlike its American counterpart, the obstacles in this show are far less severe and are restricted to conditions like "standing on a two-tonne block of ice" and "walking blindfolded through a cactus maze". 
 In Indonesia and Portugal, both Indonesian and Portuguese versions is based on Killer Karaoke, this Banijay's show is in collaboration with Fremantle productions.

References

2010s British game shows
2011 British television series debuts
2011 British television series endings
English-language television shows
ITV game shows
Musical game shows
Television series by Banijay
Television series featuring gunge